Byahatti is a village in Hubli taluk near Hubli-Dharwad city in Karnataka, India. Byahatti is also used as surname in Karnataka.

Demographics
As of the 2011 Census of India there were 2,395 households in Byahatti and a total population of 11,384 consisting of 5,705 males and 5,679 females. There were 1,288 children ages 0-6.

References

Cities and towns in Dharwad district